Paraancylotela amplidorsa is a species of beetles in the family Buprestidae, the only species in the genus Paraancylotela.

References

Monotypic Buprestidae genera